Rewe-Zentral v Bundesmonopolverwaltung für Branntwein (1979) Case C-120/78, popularly known as Cassis de Dijon after its subject matter, is an EU law decision of the European Court of Justice. The Court held that a regulation applying to both imported and to domestic goods (an "indistinctly applicable measure") that produces an effect equivalent to a quantitative import restriction is an unlawful restriction on the free movement of goods. The case is a seminal judicial interpretation of article 34 of the Treaty on the Functioning of the European Union. In the same ruling, the Court established the so-called rule of reason, allowing non-discriminatory restrictive measures to be justified on grounds other than those listed in article 36 TFEU.

Facts
Rewe, a large German retail company, wanted to import and sell Cassis de Dijon, a crème de cassis blackcurrant liqueur produced in France. The liqueur contained between 15 and 20 per cent alcohol by volume (ABV). Germany, however, had a law specifying that products sold as fruit liqueurs be over 25 per cent ABV. The Bundesmonopolverwaltung für Branntwein (Federal Monopoly Administration for Spirits), part of the Federal Ministry of Finance, informed Rewe that it would not be able to market Cassis in Germany as a liqueur.

Rewe challenged the decision as a breach of European law, specifically of Article 30 Treaty of Rome (TEC).

Judgment

The ECJ held that the German legislation represented a measure having an effect equivalent to a quantitative restriction on imports and was thus in breach of article 34 of the Treaty:

Significance

In 2010, Switzerland unilaterally adopted this principle: generally, goods that can be lawfully produced or marketed according to standards applying in the European Union can also be lawfully produced or marketed in Switzerland or imported from the EU into Switzerland.

Notes

References
Kai Purnhagen The Virtue of Cassis de Dijon 25 Years Later – It is Not Dead, it just Smells Funny, in: Varieties of European Economic Law and Regulation, hrsg. Kai Purnhagen, Peter Rott, New York, Heidelberg, Dordrecht u.a.: Springer, 2014, 315–342, 
 

 Brettschneider, Jörg, Das Herkunftslandprinzip und mögliche Alternativen aus ökonomischer Sicht, Auswirkungen auf und Bedeutung für den Systemwettbewerb, Duncker & Humblot, Berlin 2015, .

External links
Decision of ECJ at Europa Website
ec.europa.eu

1979 in case law
1979 in Germany
Alcohol in Europe
Alcohol law in Germany
European Union goods case law
France–Germany relations